Nail Girfanovich Minibayev (born 16 March 1985) is a Russian professional football coach and a former player. He works as a coach with Galaxy Tolyatti football school.

Club career
He made his debut for FC Luch-Energiya Vladivostok on 2 July 2006 in a Russian Cup Round of 32 game against FC Dynamo Makhachkala. On 20 September 2006, he appeared in the second leg of the same stage of the same competition for FC Kuban Krasnodar in a game against PFC Krylia Sovetov Samara.

External links
 

1985 births
Sportspeople from Tolyatti
Living people
Russian footballers
Russia under-21 international footballers
Association football defenders
FC Lada-Tolyatti players
FC Vityaz Podolsk players
FC Saturn Ramenskoye players
FC Luch Vladivostok players
FC Kuban Krasnodar players
FC Yenisey Krasnoyarsk players